Claudío Hélios Sessolo Salétros Teixeira (born 26 May 1993) is a Swiss footballer of Chilean-Spanish descent who plays as an attacking midfielder.

Career
He made his debut during the 2012–13 season. He scored three goals in the first round of the Swiss Cup 2013/14 against FC Veyrier Sports. 

On 7 January 2021, he joined Cypriot First Division side Ethnikos Achna. After just one game with Ethnikos, he terminated his contract and returned to Switzerland, signing with Kriens on 12 February 2021.

References

1993 births
Swiss people of Spanish descent
Swiss people of Chilean descent
Living people
Swiss men's footballers
Association football midfielders
BSC Young Boys players
FC Le Mont players
FC Lausanne-Sport players
FC Schaffhausen players
Ethnikos Achna FC players
SC Kriens players
Swiss 1. Liga (football) players
Swiss Super League players
Swiss Challenge League players
Cypriot First Division players
Swiss expatriate footballers
Expatriate footballers in Cyprus
Swiss expatriate sportspeople in Cyprus